Billy Carlson (17 October 1889 San Diego, California – 4 July 1915 Tacoma, Washington) was an American racecar driver. He was killed in an AAA National Championship race at Tacoma Speedway.

Biography

Billy Carlson began his career competing in races on the Pacific coast and was a comparative unknown before he started in the 500-mile classic at Indianapolis in 1914. He took ninth in the event and "immediately attained prominence on the gasoline circuit."

He was a member of the Maxwell team for two years in 1914 and 1915 after he was "discovered" by Ray Harroun, a Maxwell engineer. His most notable achievement after joining Maxwell was his world's non-stop record of 305 miles made at San Diego, California, in January 1915. He came in second to Barney Oldfield at Venice, California.

Carlson sustained fatal injuries in the Montamarathon race at Tacoma Speedway on July 4, 1915. Maxwell suspended their racing game for the remainder of the season and the team was disbanded and the automobiles were shipped back to the factory in Detroit.

Indy 500 results

References

1889 births
1915 deaths
Indianapolis 500 drivers
Racing drivers who died while racing
Sports deaths in Washington (state)
Racing drivers from San Diego